William Wood (born 1900; year of death unknown) was an English footballer who played in the Football League for Northampton Town and Oldham Athletic.

References

1900 births
Year of death unknown
English footballers
Association football forwards
English Football League players
Retford Town F.C. players
Oldham Athletic A.F.C. players
Northampton Town F.C. players
Swansea City A.F.C. players
Wellingborough Town F.C. players
Rugby Town F.C. players